The Trilobit Award is an annual award that recognize accomplishments in filmmaking and television. It is one of highest awards of achievement in film awarded in the Czech Republic and it is awarded by Czech Film and Television Union. The award was first awarded in 1960s but banned in the 1970. It was however, re-established in 1991.

History
 TRILOBIT 2018 
 TRILOBIT 2017 
 TRILOBIT 2016 
 TRILOBIT 2014 
 TRILOBIT 2013 
 TRILOBIT 2012 
 TRILOBIT 2011 
 TRILOBIT 2010

References

Czech film awards
Awards established in 1991
1991 establishments in Czechoslovakia
Czech television awards